Hava Nagila (Hāvā Nāgīlā, "Let us rejoice") is a Jewish folk song.  It is traditionally sung at celebrations, such as weddings.  Written in 1918, it quickly spread through the Jewish diaspora.

History 
Hava Nagila is one of the first modern Jewish folk songs in the Hebrew language. It went on to become a staple of band performers at Jewish weddings and bar/bat(b'nei) mitzvah celebrations.

The melody is based on a Hassidic Nigun. It was composed in 1918, to celebrate  the Balfour Declaration and the British victory over the Ottomans in 1917. It was first performed in a mixed choir concert in Jerusalem.

Abraham Zevi Idelsohn (1882–1938), a professor at Hebrew University, began cataloging all known Jewish music and teaching classes in musical composition; one of his students was a promising cantorial student, Moshe Nathanson, who with the rest of his class was presented by the professor with a 19th-century, slow, melodious, chant (niggun or nigun) and assigned to add rhythm and words to fashion a modern Hebrew song. There are competing claims regarding Hava Nagila's composer, with both Idelsohn and Nathanson being suggested.

The niggun has been attributed to the Sadigurer Chasidim, who lived in what is now Ukraine. This version has been recreated by Daniel Gil. The  text was probably refined by Idelsohn. Members of the community began to immigrate to Jerusalem in 1915, and Idelsohn wrote in 1932 that he had been inspired by that melody.

Lyrics

Notable performers

 Singer Harry Belafonte is known for his version of the song, which was recorded for his album Belafonte at Carnegie Hall in 1959. He rarely gave a concert without singing it, and stated that the two "stand out" songs from his professional career were "The Banana Boat Song" and "Hava Nagila". Belafonte noted and claimed, "Life is not worthwhile without it. Most Jews in America learned that song from me."
Dalida (1959) 
 Brave Combo
 Glen Campbell
 Chubby Checker
 Carmela Corren - Israeli singer
 Celia Cruz
 Dick Dale and the Del Tones (surf rock)
 Neil Diamond, in addition to having performed Hava Nagila in his 1994 Live In America concert, incorporated it into The Jazz Singer, based on Samson Raphaelson's play, in which he acted out a cantor with popular-music ambitions.
 Dream Theater performed a cover of "Hava Nagila" in Tel Aviv, Israel, on June 16, 2009.
 Bob Dylan
 The E Street Band with guest accordionists performed it at a Bruce Springsteen concert in Sunrise, Florida, on September 9, 2009.
 Lena Horne, "Now!" (US #92, 1963)
 Irving Fields
Ivan Rebroff
 Four Jacks and a Jill released a version of the song on their 1965 album, Jimmy Come Lately.
 Connie Francis
 Abraham Zevi Idelsohn published the Hebrew song book, Sefer Hashirim, in 1922, which includes the first publication of his arrangement of "Hava Nagila". He also produced the first commercial recording in 1922, on the Polyphon record label ("Order No. 8533."), as part of a series which recorded 39 Hebrew folk songs.
 Jon Lord of Deep Purple included Hava Nagila in his solo keyboard improvisations as heard on Made in Europe (1975).
 Betty Madigan, "Dance Everyone Dance" (US #31, 1958)
Me First and the Gimme Gimmes, who recorded the song live for the album Ruin Jonny's Bar Mitzvah. They also recorded a second version on the same album to the tune of Feliz Navidad.
 Frank Slay and his Orchestra, "Flying Circle" (US #45, 1962)
 The Spotnicks
 Pete Townshend, whose ability to play the song was instrumental to his induction in The Who.
 Nissim Black, a Jewish Orthodox rapper, recorded an adaptation titled "The Hava Song".

Use in sports

Basketball

Maccabi Tel Aviv
After every home Maccabi Tel Aviv win, the fan group The Gate, which is the biggest Maccabi fan group, start chanting Hava Nagila.

Association football

Ajax Amsterdam
Supporters of the Dutch association football club AFC Ajax, although not an official Jewish club, commonly use Jewish imagery. A central part of Ajax fans' culture, "Hava Nagila" can often be heard sung in the Stadium by the team's supporters, and at one point ringtones of "Hava Nagila" could even be downloaded from the club's official website.

Tottenham Hotspur
Supporters of the English football club Tottenham Hotspur commonly refer to themselves as "Yids" and say they are strongly associated with Jewish symbolism and culture. "Hava Nagila" has been adopted as an anthem of sorts by the club, and was one of the most frequently sung songs at the team's former stadium at White Hart Lane.

Other versions
George Lam recorded a Cantonese version of "Hava Nagila" titled《狂歡》("Carnival") for his 1981 album《活色生香》.

Hanna ja Niilo Hanna performs a Finnish version of the song.

See also 
 Hora (dance)
 Jewish music
 Music of Israel
 Zum Gali Gali

References

External links 

 Hava Nagila's Long, Strange Trip at My Jewish Learning
 Hora Music, How do you sing and dance "Hava Nagila" - lyrics and steps
 Hava Nagila - The Original, & Unaltered Hasidic Melody
 Who wrote "Havah Nagilah"?
 Hava Nagila at HebrewSongs.com
 Historical research includes first recording of Hava Nagila
 Romani version of "Hava Nagila" (Aven, rromalen)
 

1918 songs
Four Jacks and a Jill songs
Israeli songs
Hebrew-language songs
Jewish folk songs
AFC Ajax songs
Tottenham Hotspur F.C. songs
Glen Campbell songs
1996 singles
Dutch Top 40 number-one singles
Party Animals (music group) songs
Internet memes